Jalpa may refer to:
 Jalpa, Jharkhand, a small town and railway station in Jharkhand, India
Jalpa, Palpa, Nepal
Jalpa, Zacatecas, Mexico
Lamborghini Jalpa, a sports car